Aixtron SE is a European multinational technology company, which specialises in manufacturing metalorganic chemical vapour deposition (MOCVD) equipment, for clients in the semiconductor industry. The company's shares are listed on the Frankfurt Stock Exchange. AIXTRON is a constituent of the MDAX and TecDAX index.

History
AIXTRON was founded as a spin-out industry from RWTH Aachen University in 1983. The company was listed on the Frankfurt Stock Exchange's now-defunct Neuer Markt, in November 1997. Since going public the company has made several acquisitions, with the Scientific Equipment Division of the British company Thomas Swan & Co. and the Swedish chemical vapor deposition equipment maker Epigress AB both purchased in 1999.

The company completed a €118 million merger with American rival Genus, Inc. in March 2005 and bought British nanomaterial developer Nanoinstruments Ltd., a company spun out from the University of Cambridge, in 2007.

In December 2010 the company converted from a German Aktiengesellschaft to a Societas Europaea to reflect its European and international nature.

In October 2016 China’s Fujian Grand Chip Investment Fund LP made a bid to purchase Aixtron. The proposed acquisition was tainted by collusion; shortly before Fujian Grand Chip made its public takeover bid, San’an Optoelectronics canceled a critical order from Aixtron on dubious grounds, sending its share price down for Fujian Grand Chips to make a less-expensive offer (both San’an Optoelectronics and Fujian Grand Chips are controlled by the same state-owned semiconductor fund). As a result, Germany’s economics ministry withdrew the approval of the takeover. In November 2016 the Committee on Foreign Investment in the United States (CFIUS) recommended both sides to drop their plan, because of national security concerns.

In 2017 AIXTRON sold its ALD/CVD Memory Product line, produced in Sunnyvale (California, United States) to Eugene Technology from South Korea. AIXTRON said it continues to execute restructuring measures as well as to seek the establishment of partnerships for its OLED business in order to return to profitability in 2018, and to this end in October 2017 the OLED business became a separate company - APEVA SE.

On 24 October 2018 AIXTRON announced that it had signed a joint venture agreement with Korean company IRUJA Co. Ltd. to invest in APEVA, AIXTRON's subsidiary for OLED deposition technologies. Closing of the joint venture agreement is expected during 2018.

Operations
In 2020, 73% of AIXTRON's revenues come from clients in Asia, with around 15% coming from Europe and the remaining 12% from the United States. The company produces metalorganic chemical vapour deposition equipment, used for making a range of electronic and opto-electronic products containing compound, organic as well as nanotubes and nanofibers.

Many AIXTRON systems use a "planetary reactor" process whereby gaseous semiconductor substances are deposited on revolving wafers, while others utilise a Close Coupled "shower head" method of deposition.

Manufacturing sites are located in Herzogenrath near Aachen in Germany, and Cambridge in the United Kingdom.

References

External links

Companies established in 1983
Manufacturing companies of Germany
Technology companies of Germany
Equipment semiconductor companies
Companies based in North Rhine-Westphalia
Companies formerly listed on the Nasdaq
1983 establishments in West Germany
Companies in the TecDAX
Companies in the MDAX